Alambique Creek, or Arroyo Alembique, is a  stream located in San Mateo County, California in the United States. It is part of the San Francisquito Creek watershed.

History

The creek's name is Spanish for "still," referring to a liquor distillery. Older Spanish spells it alembique with an "e". The English spelling is alembic, a type of still that is used today. The e spelling dominates in the 1800s and continued on most maps until the 1930s. The name refers to moonshiners Tom Bowen and Nicholas Dawson, English seaman deserters, who built an illegal still on the creek in 1842. The creek runs through Wunderlich Park in Woodside, California, where, in 1904, the creek was used by J. A. Folger for the first hydro-electrical power system in the region.

Watershed
Alambique Creek begins below Skyline Boulevard on Bear Gulch Road near the intersection with Bear Glen Drive. After crossing La Honda Road, and just south of the intersection of Mountain Home Road and Portola Road, Alambique Creek enters a historic wetland pond (Lloyd's Pond) which is currently impounded by the road-fill of Portola Road and a culvert. Next, Alambique Creek flows under Portola Road into the upper Searsville Reservoir at its confluence with Sausal Creek.

Ecology
Alambique Creek was once a historical steelhead trout (coastal rainbow trout) (Oncorhynchus mykiss irideus) spawning stream. In 1981, the creek was fish sampled and two stream resident rainbow trout which have been isolated from the Bay by Searsville Dam were collected where the creek crosses La Honda Road. In May 2002, the culvert beneath Highway 84 was identified as an impassable barrier to upstream migration.

See also
List of watercourses in the San Francisco Bay Area

References

External links
San Francisquito Watershed Map, Oakland Museum 

Rivers of San Mateo County, California
Rivers of Northern California
Tributaries of San Francisquito Creek